Luther Merritt Swygert (February 5, 1905 – March 16, 1988) was a United States circuit judge of the United States Court of Appeals for the Seventh Circuit and previously was a United States district judge of the United States District Court for the Northern District of Indiana.

Education and career

Born in Miami County, Ohio, Swygert received a Bachelor of Laws from Notre Dame Law School in 1927. He was in private practice in Indiana from 1928 to 1931, and was then a deputy prosecuting attorney of Lake County, Indiana from 1931 to 1933. He was an Assistant United States Attorney of the Northern District of Indiana from 1934 to 1943.

Federal judicial service

Swygert was nominated by President Franklin D. Roosevelt on September 29, 1943, to a seat on the United States District Court for the Northern District of Indiana vacated by Judge Thomas Whitten Slick. He was confirmed by the United States Senate on October 14, 1943, and received his commission on October 16, 1943. He served as Chief Judge from 1954 to 1961. His service terminated on October 10, 1961, due to elevation to the Seventh Circuit.

Swygert was nominated by President John F. Kennedy on September 18, 1961, to the United States Court of Appeals for the Seventh Circuit, to a new seat authorized by 75 Stat. 80. He was confirmed by the Senate on September 23, 1961, and received his commission on September 29, 1961. He served as Chief Judge from 1970 to 1975. He assumed senior status on July 1, 1981. His service terminated on March 16, 1988, due to his death.

References

Sources
 

1905 births
1988 deaths
Judges of the United States District Court for the Northern District of Indiana
United States district court judges appointed by Franklin D. Roosevelt
20th-century American judges
Judges of the United States Court of Appeals for the Seventh Circuit
United States court of appeals judges appointed by John F. Kennedy
Assistant United States Attorneys
Notre Dame Law School alumni